Sardar Patel Memorial College is a degree college in Bihar Sharif in the district of Nalanda in Bihar, India. It is a constituent unit of Patliputra University. The college offers senior secondary education and undergraduate degree in arts, science, and information technology.

History 
The college was established in 1974 in the area having the remains of an ancient fort, which is believed to have been part of the Udantpuri University founded by the king Gopala of Pala Dynasty in 8th century AD. The neighbourhood is still known by the name 'Udantpuri' after the name of the ancient university.

It was converted into a constituent unit of Magadh University in 1980. The college has become a constituent unit of Patliputra University since March 2018.

Degrees and courses 
The college offers the following degrees and courses.

 Senior Secondary
 Intermediate of Arts
 Intermediate of Science
 Bachelor's degree
 Bachelor of Arts
 Bachelor of Science

References

External links 

 Official website of college
 Patliputra University website

Constituent colleges of Patliputra University
Educational institutions established in 1974
Universities and colleges in Patna
1974 establishments in Bihar